Thomas "Tom" Spight Hines, Jr. (born 1936 in Oxford) is an American architectural historian and educator. Hines is Professor Emeritus of History, as well as Architecture and Urban Design, at the University of California, Los Angeles.

Career
Born to Polly and Thomas Sr. in Oxford, Hines received his Bachelor of Arts in Liberal Arts from the University of Mississippi in 1958, and was a member of Omicron Delta Kappa. He then earned his Doctor of Philosophy in History from the University of Wisconsin–Madison in 1971. His dissertation focused on the architect Daniel Burnham, and was written under the supervision of William L. O'Neill. Since graduating, Hines has taught at the University of California, Los Angeles, where he is now Professor Emeritus of History, and has a joint appointment for Architecture and Urban Design, as well.

In 1976, Hines won the John H. Dunning Prize from the American Historical Association for his book on Burnham titled Burnham of Chicago: Architect and Planner. In addition to Burnham, Hines has also written extensively on the architects Irving Gill, Richard Neutra, and Frank Lloyd Wright.

In 1987, Hines was awarded a Guggenheim Fellowship. Seven years later, he was elected to the American Academy of Arts and Sciences.

The archive of Hines is currently held by the Getty Research Institute.

Works
Burnham of Chicago: Architect and Planner, Oxford University Press, 1974 
Richard Neutra and the Search for Modern Architecture, Oxford University Press, 1982 
Irving Gill and the Architecture of Reform, Monacelli Press, 2000 
William Faulkner and the Tangible Past: The Architecture of Yoknapatawpha, University of California Press, 1997 
Architecture of the Sun: Los Angeles Modernism, 1900-1970, Rizzoli Press, 2010

See also
List of American Academy of Arts and Sciences members (1994–2005)
List of Guggenheim Fellowships awarded in 1987
List of people from Oxford, Mississippi
List of University of California, Los Angeles people
List of University of Mississippi alumni
List of University of Wisconsin–Madison people in academics

References

External links
UCLA profile
FORT profile

1936 births
Living people
People from Oxford, Mississippi
American architectural historians
American architecture writers
American male non-fiction writers
University of Mississippi alumni
University of Wisconsin–Madison alumni
University of California, Los Angeles faculty